World Development is a monthly peer-reviewed academic journal covering development studies. It was established in 1973 and is published by Elsevier.

According to the Journal Citation Reports, the journal has a 2020 impact factor of 5.278.

References

External links

Monthly journals
Elsevier academic journals
Publications established in 1973
English-language journals
Sociology journals
Globalization-related journals
Development studies journals